The Dean of Ossory or Dean of Kilkenny is based at The Cathedral Church of St Canice, Kilkenny in the united Diocese of Cashel and Ossory within the Church of Ireland.

The current Dean is the Very Reverend Stephen Farrell, formerly Rector of Zion parish, Rathgar, Dublin and Provincial and Diocesan Registrar for the Diocese of Dublin and Glendalough.

List of deans of Ossory

1547–1552 James Bicton
1552–1555 Thomas Lancaster (also Bishop of Kildare, deprived 1555)
1559–1581 William Johnson
1582 David Cleere
1603–1610 Richard Deane (afterwards Bishop of Ossory
1610–1612 John Todd (also Bishop of Down and Connor 1607–1612)
1612 Barnabas Boulger
1617 Absolom Gethin
1621 Jenkin Mayes
1626–1661 Edward Warren
1661–1661 Charles Curren
1661–1666 Thomas Ledisham (afterwards Dean of Waterford)
1666–1667/8 Daniel Neyland
1667/8 Joseph Teate
1670/1-1673 Thomas Hill
1673/4-1674/5 Benjamin Parry (afterwards Dean of St Patrick's and Bishop of Ossory 1677)
1674/5–1697 John Pooley (afterwards Bishop of Cloyne 1697)
1702/3–1747 Robert Mossom
1747–1753 Robert Watts
1755–1783 John Lewis
1784–1795 Thomas Pack
1795–1843 Hon Joseph Bourke
1843–1877 Charles Vignoles
1877–1901 Thomas Hare
1901–?1905 James Lyons
1905–1908 Maurice Day (afterwards Bishop of Clogher 1908)
1908–1923 Thomas Edward Winder
1923–1940 John Percy Phair (afterwards Bishop of Ossory, Ferns and Leighlin 1940)
1940–?1950 James Henry Burrows 
1950–1957 George Seaver
?1957–1959 Robert Pike (afterwards Bishop of Meath, 1959)
1959–1969 John George Gash
1969–1970 Donald Caird (afterwards Bishop of Limerick, Ardfert and Aghadoe 1970)
1970–1991 Brian Harvey
1991–2010 Norman Lynas
2010–2018 Katharine M. Poulton
2018-2021 David McDonnell
2021-present Stephen Farrell

References

Deans of Ossory
Diocese of Cashel and Ossory
Kilkenny